Griphomyia is a genus of fruit fly in the family Tephritidae.

References

Phytalmiinae
Tephritidae genera